Minuscule 153 (in the Gregory-Aland numbering), ε 402 (Soden), is a Greek minuscule manuscript of the New Testament, on cotton paper. Palaeographically it has been assigned to the 14th century. Formerly it was dated to 13th century (Scrivener, Gregory).

The manuscript has complex contents and full marginalia.

Description 

The codex contains a complete text of the four Gospels on 268 cotton paper leaves (size ). The text is written in one column per page, in 22-25 lines per page (size of text 14.6 by 8.9 cm). The text is written in brown ink, the capital letters in red. The colour of paper is brown.

There is also another division according to the smaller Ammonian Sections (in Mark 241 - last numbered section in 16:20), but without references to the Eusebian Canons.

Text 

The Greek text of the codex is representative of the Byzantine text-type, but Aland did not place it in any Category.
According to the Claremont Profile Method it belongs to the textual family Family Kx in Luke 1, Luke 10, and Luke 20.

History 

It is dated by the INTF to the 14th century.

The manuscript was examined by Birch (about 1782) and Scholz. (major part of it) C. R. Gregory saw the manuscript in 1886.

It is currently housed at the Vatican Library (Pal. gr. 229), at Rome.

See also 
 List of New Testament minuscules
 Biblical manuscript
 Textual criticism

References

Further reading

External links 
 

Greek New Testament minuscules
14th-century biblical manuscripts
Manuscripts of the Vatican Library